Livetime is a live album from 1978 by musical group Hall & Oates.

The concert was recorded in Hershey, Pennsylvania in late 1977 not far from Pottstown, Pennsylvania where Hall lived during his teenage years. Former Elton John Band members Caleb Quaye, Kenny Passarelli and Roger Pope were band musicians on this tour.

Daryl Hall is infamous for being heard asking the crowd at the end of the song "Sara Smile," "How come you didn't like me when I was a teenager?"

Track listing

Personnel
Daryl Hall – vocals, keyboards
John Oates – vocals, guitar
Caleb Quaye – lead guitar
Kenny Passarelli – bass
Roger Pope – drums
Charles DeChant – saxophone, keyboards, percussion, background vocals
David Kent – keyboards, background vocals

References

Hall & Oates live albums
1978 live albums
RCA Records live albums